The Global Women's Basketball Association (GWBA) is a women's professional basketball league operating in the Midwest region of the United States. The league was founded in 2016 and features four teams. GWBA rosters are composed primarily of former collegiate players, often playing for the team nearest their former school, and former WNBA players.

History 
The league was established in 2016 by Sonya Nichols, a former basketball player for the James Madison Dukes. The inaugural season began with four teams: the Flint Monarchs, Milwaukee Aces, Akron Innovators, and Illinois Starletz. The Monarchs finished the season undefeated and won the league championship. The 2017 season saw teams play eight games instead of seven; the Monarchs again won the championship. Following the 2018 season, which was again won by the Monarchs, the league added two teams: the Wisconsin Glo and St. Louis Surge. The Glo finished their inaugural season undefeated and won the league championship, defeating the three-time defending champions Monarchs. The 2020 season was canceled due to the COVID-19 pandemic.

In 2021, the Music City Icons were replaced by the Detroit Dodgers, who ultimately forfeited the season as they were unable to field a roster. The Surge finished the regular season in first place but were upset by the Glo in the championship.

Teams

Current

Former

Champions

References 

Women's basketball leagues in the United States
Sports leagues established in 2016
2016 establishments in the United States